Saandram (സാന്ദ്രം, Lit. Dense) is a 1990 Indian Malayalam psychological thriller film, directed by Thaha and produced by Thaha and Ashokan. The film stars Suresh Gopi, Parvathy, Innocent and Captain Raju in the lead roles. The film has musical score by Johnson.

Plot
The Poulose family which comes to Ooty on vacation, befriends a newly married couple Sreeraman(Suresh Gopi) and Indulekha(Parvathy) on their honeymoon staying next door. The couple looks happy on the outside, but the wife has problems underneath the surface.

When the local Circle Inspector(Captain Raju) makes a visit, it is revealed that a psychopath Unni(Sai Kumar) is after Indulekha's life. Unni was Indulekha's ex-lover who had been comatose for over a year and a half after a fatal accident with no hope of recovery. Her parents had forced her to a reluctant marriage with Sreeraman. But Unni made a miraculous recovery afterwards but with a mental imbalance which leaves him with no sense of time. He is deluded into thinking that he was hospitalised only for a few days and Indu had married betraying him, even that his accident was her doing. As such he is after her life now.

In the end, after a thick fight with Sreeraman, Unni is shot dead by Poulose just before he almost stabs Indulekha.

Cast

Suresh Gopi as Sreeraman
Parvathy as Indulekha Sreeraman
Innocent as Poulose Anammottil
Kalpana as Anna Poulose
Kuthiravattam Pappu as Caesar
Master Badusha as Ukkru Poulose
Master Twinku as Kariya Poulose
Praseetha as Sofiya Poulose
N. L. Balakrishnan as Balakrishnan
Mamukkoya as Abdu/Abdulla
Sai Kumar as Unnikrishnan
Jagadish as Markosekutty
Captain Raju as Circle Inspector
Ranjini – Cameo Appearance as the Circle Inspector's partner

Soundtrack
The music was composed by Johnson and the lyrics were written by Kaithapram.

References

External links
 

1990 films
1990s Malayalam-language films
Films scored by Johnson